Anna Klim (born 6 December 1975), now Anna Eagle, is an Australian former professional tennis player.

Klim is a native of Poland and emigrated to Australia with her family as a child. Her younger brother is two-time Olympic gold medal winning swimmer Michael Klim. She was a student at Wesley College, Melbourne.

Active on the professional tour in the 1990s, Klim made a career high singles ranking of 447. She qualified for a WTA Tour main draw in 1995 at the Surabaya Women's Open and featured in qualifying for the 1996 Australian Open.

ITF finals

Doubles: 3 (1–2)

References

External links
 
 

1975 births
Living people
Australian female tennis players
Polish emigrants to Australia
People educated at Wesley College (Victoria)